This page shows the progress of Bury F.C.'s season in 2011–12. They will play their games in the third tier of English football, Football League One.

League table

Squad statistics

Appearances and goals

|-
|colspan="14"|Players played for Bury this season who are no longer at the club:

|-
|colspan="14"|Players who played for Bury on loan and returned to their parent club:

|}

Top scorers

Disciplinary record

Results and fixtures

Pre-season friendlies

League One

FA Cup

League Cup

Football League Trophy

Transfers

Awards

References 

Bury F.C. seasons
Bury